The Mandorla Art Award is an Australian religious art prize, where the artists are given a theme inspired by the Christian scriptures akin to the historic requests by the church to create visual images that tell the stories of the Bible.

The award commenced in 1985 with finalists work exhibited at New Norcia Monastery Museum and Art Gallery, St John of God Hospitals in Perth, Western Australia.

Past winners

Notes

References

External links

Australian art awards
New Norcia, Western Australia